Wong Chun Yue (born 28 January 1978 in Hong Kong) is a Hong Kong football coach and a former professional football player.

Wong played as a right winger and he sometimes plays as a striker as well.

Workable FC

On 19 January 2008, Wong scored the winning goal in a League Cup match against his previous club South China.

Honours

As a player

Club
Sun Hei
Hong Kong First Division League: 2001-02, 2003-04, 2004-05
Hong Kong League Cup: 2002–03, 2003–04, 2004–05
Hong Kong Senior Shield: 2004-05, 2011–12
Hong Kong FA Cup: 2002-03, 2004-05

South China
Hong Kong First Division League: 2006-07
Hong Kong Senior Shield: 2006-07
Hong Kong FA Cup: 2006-07

Individual
Hong Kong Senior Shield Top Scorer: 2006–07

As a coach

Club
Eastern
Hong Kong Premier League: 2015-16

Club career
As of 19 May 2007

Notes and references

External links
Wong Chun Yue at HKFA

1978 births
Living people
Hong Kong footballers
Hong Kong international footballers
Association football wingers
Hong Kong First Division League players
Eastern Sports Club footballers
Happy Valley AA players
Hong Kong Rangers FC players
South China AA players
Sun Hei SC players
Tai Po FC players
Shek Kip Mei SA players
Hong Kong League XI representative players